Coton Hill may refer to several places:

Coton Hill, Shropshire, a suburb of Shrewsbury, England
Coton Hill, Staffordshire, a hamlet in Staffordshire, England